My Amnesia Girl is a 2010 Filipino romantic film starring John Lloyd Cruz and Toni Gonzaga. It was released by Star Cinema and directed by Cathy Garcia-Molina. The film is the highest grossing Filipino film of 2010.

Plot
When Glen Apollo (John Lloyd Cruz) finds himself surrounded by friends who are beginning to settle down, he is faced with the possibility of finding his true love. It all boils down to one name: Irene. It must be fate then, when he once again sees Irene (Toni Gonzaga), his ex-girlfriend from 3 years ago with whom he had the best memories with. Apollo and Irene were a perfect couple, and were engaged to be married. It all ended at the altar when Apollo had a bout of cold feet and left Irene alone in the aisle.

Now, Irene has no recollection of Apollo, having acquired “amnesia” shortly after their separation. Apollo sees this as the perfect opportunity to pursue Irene again, and be able to undo all the mistakes he made in the past, by offering Irene the best memories she could ever have.

True love is difficult to resist, they learn. Just when they find themselves ready to commit to each other, the pains from the past catch up with them, challenging them to finally own up to the mistakes made and lies said, and eventually realize what it is to forgive and forget.

Cast

Main cast

 John Lloyd Cruz as Apollo / Pol
 Toni Gonzaga as Irene

Supporting cast
 Beatriz Saw as Peachy
 Joross Gamboa as Jan
 Carlos Agassi as Ken
 JM De Guzman as Eric
 Ketchup Eusebio as Chibu
 Atoy Co as Tatay Diego
 Diane Medina as Jen
 Nico Antonio as Poch
 Cai Cortez as Maia

With special participation
 Angel Locsin as MMA Fighter
 Kaye Abad as Teacher
 Denise Laurel as Perfectionist
 Jodi Sta. Maria as Flight Attendant

Reception
The film was well received by the critics and became commercially successful. It is considered the highest grossing film of 2010 having a total gross of P164 million pesos nationwide. Cruz and Gonzaga were respectively named as the "Box-Office King and Queen" of 2010, by SM Cinemas.

Awards

References

External links
 

2010 films
Films directed by Cathy Garcia-Molina
Philippine romantic comedy films
Filipino-language films
Star Cinema comedy films
2010 romantic comedy films
2010s English-language films